The 1984–85 Eastern Counties Football League season was the 43rd in the history of Eastern Counties Football League a football competition in England.

League Table

The league featured 21 clubs which competed in the league last season, along with one new club:
Harwich & Parkeston, transferred from the Athenian League

League table

References

External links
 Eastern Counties Football League

1984-85
1984–85 in English football leagues